Susan Longden (born 22 January 1950) is a British athlete. She competed in the women's pentathlon at the 1976 Summer Olympics and the 1980 Summer Olympics.

References

1950 births
Living people
Athletes (track and field) at the 1976 Summer Olympics
Athletes (track and field) at the 1980 Summer Olympics
British pentathletes
Olympic athletes of Great Britain
People from Epping